South Korean football in 2023.

National teams
Source:

Men's senior

Fixtures and results

Women's senior

Fixtures and results

Leagues

K League 1

K League 2

K3 League

K4 League

WK-League

Cups

Korean FA Cup

South Korean clubs performance in Asia

Champions League

See also
Korea Football Association (KFA)

References

External links

Seasons in South Korean football